Nathan Thomas may refer to:

 Nathan Thomas (water polo) (born 1972), Australian water polo player
 Nathan Thomas (rugby union) (born 1976), Welsh rugby union footballer
 Nathan Thomas (footballer) (born 1994), English footballer